Austin Louis Cindric (born September 2, 1998) is an American professional auto racing driver. He competes full-time in the NASCAR Cup Series, driving the No. 2 Ford Mustang for Team Penske.

Prior to competing in stock cars, Cindric raced with a variety of disciplines including sports cars, the Road to Indy ladder, and the Global RallyCross Championship. His first NASCAR start came in the NASCAR Camping World Truck Series in 2015, and he finished third in that series' standings in 2017 before moving up to the Xfinity Series. He won the 2020 NASCAR Xfinity Series Championship and the 2022 Daytona 500.

Racing career

Early career
Cindric started his career in semi-professional legends car and Bandolero racing in North Carolina. After attending the Skip Barber Racing School to gain road racing experience, in 2013 and 2014 he raced in the U.S. F2000 National Championship. In 2013 he finished 17th in points driving for Andretti Autosport with a best finish of seventh in the season finale. In 2014 he switched teams to Pabst Racing Services, finishing 14th in points with a second-place podium finish on the oval at Lucas Oil Raceway. He also competed in Historic Sportscar Racing, winning a race in a Porsche 944.

In 2014, Cindric began competing in the Global RallyCross Championship Lites, winning the bronze medal in his debut at X Games Austin 2014. In October, he made his IMSA Continental Tire Sports Car Challenge debut for Racers Edge Motorsports at Road Atlanta with David Levine as co-driver, finishing 17th. During the year, he was named a member of the Porsche North American Junior Academy. In 2015, at age 17, Cindric competed in the Bathurst 12 Hour, the youngest driver to compete in the event, driving the No. 63 Mercedes-Benz SLS AMG for Erebus Motorsport; he finished 21st overall and seventh in his class. He began competing full-time in the CTSCC in 2015, driving for Multimatic Motorsports with Jade Buford as co-driver. In July, he won the CTSCC race at Canadian Tire Motorsport Park, becoming the youngest (age 17) winner in the series.

In 2016, he drove the No. 6 McLaren for K-PAX Racing in the Pirelli World Challenge.

Stock car racing

Regional and Truck Series
In July 2015, Cindric made his ARCA Racing Series debut at the #ThisIsMySpeedway 150 at Iowa Speedway, driving the No. 99 for Cunningham Motorsports; Cindric started and finished fourth in the race. He made his NASCAR debut in the Camping World Truck Series, driving the No. 29 Ford F-150 for Brad Keselowski Racing at Martinsville as a substitute for Austin Theriault who was still recovering from his injury at Las Vegas.

In addition to his Pirelli World Challenge schedule in 2016, he joined Martin-McClure Racing for two K&N Pro Series East events and Brad Keselowski Racing in the No. 2 F-150 at Dover International Speedway. His two K&N East starts resulted in victories at Virginia International Raceway and Watkins Glen International. Later in the year, he recorded his first ARCA win at Kentucky Speedway. That October, Cindric made his restrictor track debut at Talladega, finishing 20th. In November 2016, BKR announced Cindric would compete full-time in the Truck Series in 2017.

During the 2017 NASCAR Camping World Truck Series season, he grabbed the pole for the season's lone road course race at Canadian Tire Motorsport Park. Although he led the most laps that day, differing strategies saw Cindric behind Kaz Grala on the last lap. Cindric, on newer tires, made contact with Grala, causing the No. 33 to spin. Cindric went on to win and claim a playoff berth in team Brad Keselowski Racing's final season. Grala claimed that he got run over, but Cindric marginalized his maneuver by calling it a "last resort" and claiming that it was justified by the need for a playoff spot. The move drew widespread criticism from other drivers, including Justin Allgaier and Christopher Bell. A week after the Mosport incident, Cindric made a Global Rallycross start in which he collided with Scott Speed coming out of a joker lap. That led to a verbal confrontation from Speed afterward and again drew the ire of the NASCAR community on social media.

Xfinity Series

In August 2017, Cindric joined Team Penske's No. 22 car for the Xfinity Series race at Road America.

In 2018, Cindric ran the full Xfinity schedule, splitting time between three different Ford Mustangs: Penske's No. 12 and No. 22 Fords, and the No. 60 Ford of Roush Fenway Racing. Cindric got his first pole at Iowa in the season's 14th race, where his No. 22 car had a history of success, though he faded back to 11th in the race after finishing second in the first stage. He was involved in a violent crash in the Daytona race, in which he barrel-rolled twice in turn 2. In Cindric's last ride with the No. 60 Roush Fenway car at Darlington, he was turned by Ryan Truex exiting turn 4 on the third lap and spun out resulting in a 40th-place finish. The car, split between Cindric, Chase Briscoe, and Ty Majeski, attracted notoriety during the season for being involved in numerous accidents, ending the year with 28: 22 brought out a caution flag, six spins that did not produce a caution, and four wrecks during practice or qualifying.

On November 8, 2018, Team Penske announced that Cindric would compete full-time in their No. 22 Ford Mustang in 2019. MoneyLion was the primary sponsor for 18 races, part of a multi-year deal with the team.

In August 2019, Cindric scored his first career NXS wins with back-to-back road course victories at Watkins Glen and Mid-Ohio. He finished the 2019 season sixth in points after finishing seventh at Homestead.

Cindric scored his first oval victories in July 2020 at Kentucky Speedway, where he swept the weekend's Xfinity races Shady Rays 200 and Alsco 300. He was the first driver to win national series races at the same track on two consecutive days since Richard Petty in 1971. The victories began a seven-race stretch in which he won or finished second, including his third straight win at Texas Motor Speedway after Kyle Busch's disqualification and back-to-back road course victories at Road America and the Daytona road course. He won the regular season championship with a tenth-place finish in the finale at Richmond, and entered the playoffs with five wins. Cindric won at Phoenix to win the championship. Cindric also led the non-playoff points standings and led all drivers in top fives (19) and top tens (26).

Cindric would return to the No. 22 Ford Mustang in 2021. Cindric took his first win of 2021 at Daytona in February, followed by additional victories at Phoenix, Dover, Pocono, and the Indianapolis Road Course. He led much of the regular season standings but finished runner-up in the regular-season finale at Bristol to A. J. Allmendinger when the two made contact coming to the finish and slid across the line.

Cindric lost the lead and the championship in turn 3 to Daniel Hemric on the last lap of Phoenix in 2021.

Cup Series

During the Monster Energy NASCAR Cup Series' 2019 Folds of Honor QuikTrip 500 weekend at Atlanta Motor Speedway, Cindric replaced Brad Keselowski for final practice as Keselowski was experiencing flu-like symptoms. Cindric remained on standby for the race, but Keselowski ran the full event and went on to win. In September, Cindric once again served as a practice substitute driver, this time for Michael McDowell at the Bank of America Roval 400 while McDowell was being treated for a kidney stone.

In October 2020, Team Penske announced Cindric would begin racing in the Cup Series in 2021 on a part-time basis before moving to up to the series full-time in 2022 in the Wood Brothers Racing No. 21, replacing Matt DiBenedetto. He would run his part-time schedule in the Cup Series in a part-time fourth car for Penske, the No. 33. Cindric's first Cup Series start came in the 2021 Daytona 500, where he finished 15th after being involved in a fiery last-lap crash. He led laps at Circuit of the Americas and Road America, and scored his first Cup top ten at Indianapolis when he finished ninth.

On July 15, 2021, Team Penske announced Cindric would instead drive the team's No. 2 car in 2022, replacing Brad Keselowski as he left to become the driver of the No. 6 car for Roush Fenway Racing as well as a co-owner of the team, which was renamed RFK Racing.

On February 20, 2022, Cindric won the 2022 Daytona 500 in his first full-time Cup Series season driving for Team Penske. It was only his eighth Cup Series start. Cindric became the ninth driver to win his first Cup Series race in the Daytona 500. At the age of 23, Cindric also became the second-youngest driver in NASCAR history to win the Daytona 500. It was the third Daytona 500 win for Team Penske, who previously won the 2008 race with Ryan Newman, driving the No. 12 car and the 2015 race with Joey Logano, driving the No. 22 car. It was also the first Daytona 500 win for Team Penske's flagship No. 2 car. The following week, Cindric won the pole at the Auto Club Speedway in Fontana, California and finished 12th. As a result of that finish, Cindric led the points again for two weeks in a row, becoming the second rookie in NASCAR history (after Jimmie Johnson) to lead the NASCAR Cup Series points standings in consecutive weeks. On July 20, crew chief Jeremy Bullins was suspended for four races due to a tire and wheel loss during the 2022 Ambetter 301 at Loudon. Cindric was eliminated in the Round of 12 after finishing 21st at the Charlotte Roval. He finished the season 12th in the points standings and won the NASCAR Rookie of the Year honors.

Personal life
He is the son of Team Penske president Tim Cindric and the grandson of former IndyCar team owner and Red Roof Inn founder Jim Trueman. Cindric graduated from Cannon School on May 18, 2017, hours before he competed in the Truck Series race at the nearby Charlotte Motor Speedway.

Racing record

American Open-Wheel racing results
(key) (Races in bold indicate pole position, races in italics indicate fastest race lap)

USF2000 National Championship results

Stock car career summary 

† As Cindric was a guest driver, he was ineligible for championship points.

NASCAR
(key) (Bold - Pole position awarded by qualifying time. Italics – Pole position earned by points standings or practice time. * – Most laps led.)

Cup Series

Daytona 500

Xfinity Series

Camping World Truck Series

K&N Pro Series East

 Season still in progress
 Ineligible for series points

ARCA Racing Series
(key) (Bold – Pole position awarded by qualifying time. Italics – Pole position earned by points standings or practice time. * – Most laps led.)

Complete Global Rallycross Championship results
(key)

Supercar

GRC Lites

Complete WeatherTech SportsCar Championship results
(key) (Races in bold indicate pole position; races in italics indicate fastest lap)

References

External links

 
 

Living people
1998 births
Racing drivers from Ohio
X Games athletes
Global RallyCross Championship drivers
ARCA Menards Series drivers
U.S. F2000 National Championship drivers
24 Hours of Daytona drivers
Team Penske drivers
RFK Racing drivers
NASCAR Xfinity Series champions
NASCAR Xfinity Series regular season champions
Multimatic Motorsports drivers
JDC Motorsports drivers
Bryan Herta Autosport drivers
Andretti Autosport drivers
Mercedes-AMG Motorsport drivers
Michelin Pilot Challenge drivers
WeatherTech SportsCar Championship drivers